Elizabeth Hardy may refer to:

Elizabeth Hardy (novelist) (1794–1854), Irish writer
Elizabeth Hardy (chemist) (fl. 1940), American organic chemist